Ali-Naqi Vaziri, also transcribed as Ali Naghi Vaziri (Persian: علی نقی وزیری) (October 1, 1886 in Tehran, Persia – September 9, 1979) was a composer, thinker and a celebrated player of the tar. He is considered a revolutionary icon in the history of 20th-century Persian music.

Ali-Naqi Vaziri (also known as Colonel Vaziri) is one of the seven children of Musa Khan Vaziri (a prominent official in the Persian Cossack Brigade) and Bibi Khatoon Astarabadi, a notable Iranian writer, satirist and one of the pioneering figures in the women's movement of Iran; her book Ma'ayeb al-Rejal (Failings of Men, also translated as Vices of Men) is considered by some as the first declaration of women's rights in the modern history of Iran. The celebrated artistic painter Hassan Ali Khan Vaziri is Ali-Naqi's brother.

Ali-Naqi Vaziri was a master of Persian classical music, so he was able to play the tar in a style very reminiscent of that of Mirza Abdollah. He always looked for new dimensions and perspectives in musical expression, and by doing so he revolutionized the style of playing the tar. He was the first to transcribe the classical radif of the Persian music. He developed the sori and koron symbols to annotate Persian quarter-tone notes in standardized musical notation.

Vaziri for years was the director of the Tehran Conservatory of Music and a professor at the University of Tehran.

Innovations
Vaziri was one the first Persian musicians in the 20th century to go to Europe to study music, and after his return to Tehran in 1924. He was for a long time the only traditional instrumentalist familiar with and promoted the theory of Western classical music. He was also the first who wrote a method for a Persian instrument. This method Dastur-e Tar was published in Berlin in 1922.

Vaziri was the first to introduce and promote equal moderation in classical Persian music; in this way, each octave was evenly divided into 24 notes. This method made it possible to use Western system to harmonise traditional Persian melodies. His experiments with musical scale was work in the direction of blending Western polyphony into Persian music. His creation of the 24 step scale was created "with the intention of accommodating the application of Western harmony to musical compositions within Persian modes." He first described this view briefly in The Grammar and then in more detail in Theoretical Music. He invented a new Persian music notation for accidentals, calling the additions sori and koron; the first raises the bottom of a note by a quarter of a step and the second lowers it by a quarter of a step. Vaziri's theory for classical Persian music was heavily rejected since the 1960s.

Alinaghi Vaziri trained students, some of whom became famous in Persian music, including: Abolhassan Saba, Ruhollah Khaleghi, Javad Maroufi, Heshmat Sanjari. He invited some artists of his time (such as Ali Dashti, Ali Akbar Dehkhoda, Gholamreza Rashid-Yasemi, Badiozzaman Forouzanfar and Hassan Taqizadeh) together to establish an "Academy of Fine Arts" with the aim of collecting a culture of musical words and which may have become the basis for the formation of the Academy of Persian Language and Literature.

References

Khaleghi, R., Sargozasht e Musighi e Iran, Ferdowsi Publication, 1955, (in Persian)
 Ella Zonis, Contemporary Art Music in Persia, The Musical Quarterly, Vol. 51, No. 4, pp. 636–648 (1965). JSTOR
 Hormoz Farhat, The Dastgāh Concept in Persian Music (Cambridge University Press, 1990). ,  (first paperback edition, 2004). For a review of this book see: Stephen Blum, Ethnomusicology, Vol. 36, No. 3, Special Issue: Music and the Public Interest, pp. 422–425 (1992). JSTOR
 Laudan Nooshin, in The New Grove Dictionary of Music and Musicians, edited by Stanley Sadie, second edition (Macmillan, London, 2001). . (Oxford University Press, 2001). .

External links

 Ali-Naqi Vaziri (In English) Encyclopedia Iranica

1886 births
1979 deaths
Iranian composers
Iranian tar players
People from Gorgan
People of Qajar Iran
20th-century Iranian musicians
Vazirovs